Eva Sallis (also Eva Hornung) (born 1964) is an Australian novelist, poet, writer and a visiting research fellow at University of Adelaide. She has won several awards, including The Australian/Vogel Literary Award and the Nita May Dobbie Literary Award for her first novel Hiam.

Life
Eva Sallis was born in Bendigo. She has an MA in literature and a PhD in comparative literature from the University of Adelaide. Sallis lived in Yemen while undertaking research for her PhD, and now lives and works in Adelaide.

Career

Sallis's first novel, the best-selling Hiam, won the 1997 The Australian/Vogel Literary Award and the 1999 Nita May Dobbie Literary Award. Her second novel, City of Sealions, was well received, and her novel-in-stories, Mahjar won the Steele Rudd Award. Her 2005 book Fire Fire, told the story of gifted children growing up in a dysfunctional, loving family in 1970s Australia. Her 2009 novel Dog Boy won the 2010 Australian Prime Minister's Literary Award for fiction.

Sallis is a human rights activist, helping to found the organisation Australians Against Racism. In 2007 she presented the Dymphna Clark Memorial Lecture.

Works
Hiam (1998) 
Sheherazade Through the Looking Glass: The Metamorphosis of the 'Thousand and One Nights' (Routledge Studies in Middle Eastern Literatures) (1999)
The City of Sealions (2002)
Mahjar (2003)
Fire Fire (2005)
The Marsh Birds (2006)
Dog Boy (2009) (as by "Eva Hornung")
 (as by "Eva Hornung")

Awards

References

External links
A conversation with Eva Sallis about her latest novel Fire Fire for the Books & Writing web site.
Eva Sallis at the Bookfinder web site
Eva Sallis at the Library Thing seb site
Eva Sallis and her novel Fire Fire

1964 births
People from Bendigo
Living people
University of Adelaide alumni
Australian human rights activists
Women human rights activists
Australian women novelists